Dewain Whitmore Jr. is an American Grammy Award-winning singer, songwriter, and vocal producer based in Los Angeles, California. Signed to Disney Music Publishing, he has worked with numerous popular acts, including Chris Brown, Nick Jonas, DNCE, Martin Garrix, Khalid, Usher, Kelly Clarkson, The Wanted, Mary J Blige, James Blunt, BoA, and Exo amongst others. His works have accumulated over 12 million in sales.

Early life 
Born and raised in Kansas City, Missouri, Whitmore was exposed to many styles of music at an early age. Growing up on a very special blend of musical influences stretching from Smokey Robinson, Lionel Richie and Stevie Wonder, all the way to Michael McDonald, Kenny Loggins, Toto, George Michael, Billy Joel, James Taylor and Kenny Rogers, his inspiration is one big nostalgic melting pot.

Music career 
Whitmore's big break came in 2011, after re-locating to Los Angeles. After one year of being in LA, Whitmore was introduced to Chris Brown, who recorded two of his songs, "Up To You" and "Should've Kissed You", which featured on Brown's fourth studio album FAME. The album reached No. 1 in 3 countries, and sold over 2 million copies worldwide. The album earned a nomination at the 54th Grammy Awards, for Best R&B Album. F.A.M.E. won in the Best R&B Album category.  That same year, Whitmore vocal produced Kelly Clarkson's first single "Mr. Know It All" from her studio album Stronger, The album Stronger went on to win Best Pop Vocal Album at the 55th Grammy Awards. In November 2011, Whitmore collaborated with Mary J.Blige, on the song "You Want This", which was included on Bliges’ 10th studio album My Life II... The Journey Continues (Act 1). The album was certified gold, selling over 500,000 copies.

On June 29, 2012, Chris Brown released his Billboard No. 1 album Fortune. Whitmore wrote three songs on the album, including "Stuck On Stupid" , "Party Hard" and "Free Run". The album earned a nomination at the 55th Grammy Awards, for Best Urban Contemporary Album The album also reached No. 1 in 5 countries.

The next year, Whitmore reached more commercial success, with collaborations with Usher, Ciara, The Wanted and once again Chris Brown. Co-writing the single and title track "X" (#98 Billboard Hot 100), from Browns' sixth studio album X, which reached No. 1 on the Billboard US Top R&B/Hip Hop Albums and No. 2 on the US Billboard 200. The album would go on to be nominated for Best Urban Contemporary Album at the 57th Annual Grammy Awards.

In 2015, Whitmore teamed up with frequent collaborator Brown on his 7th studio album titled Royalty, co-writing three songs. The album reached No. 1 on the Billboard US Top R&B/Hip Hop Albums chart and No. 2 on the US Billboard 200 chart. That same year, Whitmore collaborated with K-pop group EXO on their album EXODUS. The album topped Billboard's World Albums Chart on the issue date of April 18, 2015, and stayed in the top 10 for six consecutive weeks.

On June 15, 2018, Martin Garrix released his new single "Ocean" featuring Khalid, which was co-written by Whitmore. The single reached No. 1 at US dance radio, No. 5 on Billboard US Hot Dance/Electronic Songs, and Top 10 Billboard US Dance Club Songs. Whitmore continued his dance success with another collaboration with Garrix and fellow Dutch DJ Justin Mylo, on the single "Burn Out". The track was co-written and features vocals from Whitmore, and reached No. 26 at Billboard US Hot Dance/Electronic Songs.

Selected discography

Grammy Awards 

|-
| 2011
| Chris Brown – F.A.M.E
| Best R&B Album
| 
|-
| 2012
| Kelly Clarkson – Stronger
| Best Pop Vocal Album
| 
|-
| 2012
| Chris Brown – Fortune
| Best Urban Contemporary Album
| 
|-
| 2013
| TGT – Three Kings
| Best R&B Album
| 
|-
| 2014
| Chris Brown – X
| Best Urban Contemporary Album
| 
|}

References

External links
 Info site
 Info site
 Info site

Year of birth missing (living people)
Living people
American male singer-songwriters
Record producers from Missouri
People from Kansas City, Missouri
Singer-songwriters from Missouri